Stig Cederberg (11 December 1913 – 25 September 1980) was a Swedish bantamweight boxer who won a silver medal at the 1934 European Championships and finished fourth at the 1936 Summer Olympics.

References

1913 births
1980 deaths
Sportspeople from Stockholm
Bantamweight boxers
Olympic boxers of Sweden
Boxers at the 1936 Summer Olympics
Swedish male boxers
20th-century Swedish people